Molaris may refer to:
 Molaris (software), a software using the empirical valence bond approach to calculate free energies of enzymatic reactions
 Dens molaris, a Latin expression for designing the molar (tooth)
 Chomatodus molaris, a prehistoric fish in genus Chomatodus
Scopula molaris, a moth in the family Geomitridae